Texas Tower 4 (ADC ID: TT-4) was a United States Air Force Texas Tower General Surveillance Radar station, located  south-southeast off the coast of Long Island, New York in  of water. Hurricane Donna struck the tower in September 1960, seriously damaging it. The tower was the site of an accident and was destroyed by a winter storm on January 15, 1961. None of the twenty-eight airmen and civilian contractors who were manning the station survived.

Texas Tower 4 was one in a series of manned radar stations called "Texas Towers" because they resembled the oil-drilling platforms of the Gulf of Mexico. Air Defense Command (ADC) estimated that the Texas Towers would help extend contiguous East Coast radar coverage some 300 to 500 miles seaward. This would provide the United States with an extra 30 minutes of warning time in the event of an incoming bomber attack by the Soviet Union.

History

Early history 
Texas Tower 4 began construction in December 1956 in South Portland, Maine, after construction was awarded to J. Rich Steers, Inc. of New York City in collaboration with Morrison-Knudsen, Inc., of Boise, Idaho.  On June 28, 1957, it was successfully floated and towed to its site and erected.  During transportation, two or three structural supports were dislodged in rough seas. The Air Force considered two options: whether to fix the problem before or after erecting the radar platform. The latter was chosen, which affected the structural integrity of the platform.

In 1958, enough of the structure was complete that one AN/FPS-3 search radar and two AN/FPS-6 height finder radars developed by Air Force Rome Air Development Center [RADC] New York, were installed.

Use 
Personnel from the 646th Radar Squadron, stationed at Highlands Air Force Station, NJ operated the tower.  The 4604th Support Squadron (Texas Towers) at Otis AFB, MA provided logistical support. The Tower communicated with the Highlands Air Force Station via the AN/FRC-56 Tropospheric scatter communications system. Originally 70 personnel manned the station under the command of Lt. Col. Robert Cutler.  Life aboard Texas Tower 4 was difficult. Both the structure and its crew suffered from the near-constant vibration caused by rotating radar antennas and diesel generators. The surrounding ocean and tower footings also transmitted distant sounds along the steel legs, amplifying them throughout the entire structure.

By early 1961, the crew had been reduced to 14 Air Force personnel and 14 repairmen due to concerns over the inability of successive repairs crews to halt the movement of the structure. Prior to the collapse, the tower had weathered two cyclones over a two-year period.

Collapse and investigation 
Texas Tower 4 suffered severe structural damage during Hurricane Donna in September 1960, resulting in the decision to reduce the crew down to the level of 28.  By January 1961, the tower's commanding officer, Captain Gordon Phelan, made repeated requests to evacuate the tower completely, but this was rejected on grounds that the station was constantly monitored by Soviet ships, and abandoning it would enable the Soviets to board it and capture its highly advanced radar equipment.  Finally at 4 pm on January 15, after receiving numerous reports of serious damage to the station throughout the day, the Air Force authorized full evacuation of Texas Tower 4.  With a heavy storm making helicopter operations impossible, Navy and Coast Guard ships were dispatched to the station.  At 6:45 pm, the station sent out a distress call reporting "We're breaking up".  None of the approaching ships reached it in time, and it vanished from radar contact at approximately 7:20 pm.  The tower had collapsed into the sea, taking with it the lives of all twenty-eight airmen and civilian contractors who were manning the station.  Only two bodies were recovered.

A Board of Inquiry was convened at Otis Air Force Base. By March 21, 1961, a colonel, the acting commander of the Boston Air Defense sector, was charged with involuntary manslaughter and two other officers, commanding officer and executive officer of the 4604th Air Support Squadron, were charged with dereliction of duty. Charges against the CO and XO were dropped in June 1961. A court martial board dismissed all charges against the colonel on August 24, 1961.

In May 1961, hearings chaired by Senator John C. Stennis on the collapse of the tower were held before the Preparedness Investigating Subcommittee of the United States Senate Committee on Armed Services. The committee concluded that human error, on the part of engineers, building contractors, the Air Force and the Navy, was responsible for the accident. The Navy was mentioned for its supervision of the construction and repair of the tower.

Current status 
Today the wreckage of TT-4 remains at the bottom of the ocean, and has become a site for scuba diving. However, its depth of about  limits access to the wreckage to advanced divers.

The Museum of New Jersey Maritime History, located in Beach Haven, NJ, currently hosts the largest public collection of artifacts recovered from TT-4.

The site is also the location of a National Oceanic and Atmospheric Administration buoy.

Units and assignments 
Units:
 646th Radar Squadron (Flight), (Operations unit based at Highlands AFS, NJ), 1 April 1959 – 15 January 1961
 4604th Support Squadron (Texas Towers) (Logistics support unit based at Otis AFB, MA), 1 April 1959 – 15 January 1961

Assignments:
 Boston Air Defense Sector, 1 April 1959 – 15 January 1961

See also 
 List of USAF Aerospace Defense Command General Surveillance Radar Stations

References 

 Winkler, David F. (1997), Searching the skies: the legacy of the United States Cold War defense radar program. Prepared for United States Air Force Headquarters Air Combat Command.
  A Handbook of Aerospace Defense Organization 1946–1980,  by Lloyd H. Cornett and Mildred W. Johnson, Office of History, Aerospace Defense Center, Peterson Air Force Base, Colorado
 Information for Texas Tower No.4 (Unnamed Shoal)
 The Texas Towers

External links 
Gallery of the construction of the tower

Radar stations of the United States Air Force
Installations of the United States Air Force
Aerospace Defense Command
Offshore installations
Maritime disasters
1958 establishments in the United States
1961 disestablishments in the United States
Military installations established in 1958
Military installations closed in 1961